Veikoso Poloniati (born 27 August 1995) is a New Zealand rugby union player who plays for  in Super Rugby. His playing position is lock. He was named in the Moana Pasifika squad for the 2022 Super Rugby Pacific season. He also represented  in the 2021 Bunnings NPC.

References

External links
 

1995 births
New Zealand rugby union players
Living people
Rugby union locks
Manawatu rugby union players
Moana Pasifika players
Tongan rugby union players
Tonga international rugby union players
Racing 92 players